Richmond-Burton Community High School is a four-year public high school located in Richmond, Illinois, United States. One middle school (Nippersink Middle School) feeds into the high school.

Community
Richmond is located on the Illinois-Wisconsin border.  Richmond is about 44 miles south-southwest of Milwaukee and 64 miles northwest of Chicago.

Academics
Illinois uses the ISAT and the PSAE tests to assess elementary through high school students' achievement in relation to performance standards expectations. In 2009 students at Richmond Burton outperformed the state average in all categories.

Math 65% proficient  (State Average 52%)
Reading 65% proficient  (State Average 57%)
Science 67% proficient  (State Average 51%)<ref name="Aptitude Test Scores"

Activities
Richmond-Burton's athletic teams are known as the "Rockets" or for female teams the "Lady Rockets", and compete in the Kishwaukee River Conference.

Marching Band
Jazz Band
Concert Band
Baseball
Basketball
Cheerleading
Choir
Cross Country
Dance Team
Drama
Football
Golf
ICTM math contest
Soccer
Softball
Swimming
Academic Team
Track
Volleyball
Wrestling
WYSE

References

External links

http://www.ihsa.org/school/schools/1805.htm

Public high schools in Illinois
Richmond, Illinois
Schools in McHenry County, Illinois